Alone in the Night (French: Seul dans la nuit) is a 1945 French drama film directed by Christian Stengel and starring Bernard Blier and starring Bernard Blier, Sophie Desmarets and  Jacques Pills

The film recorded admissions in France of 2,844,119. It was shot at the Joinville Studios in Paris. The film's sets were designed by the art director Robert Gys.

Synopsis 
A series of crimes is being perpetrated around a famous singer. Strangely, during each of the crimes, the artist's voice is heard humming his favorite song. Suspicions lead to a chase through a nocturnal Paris, ending in a disused theater where the assassin has lured his final victim.

Cast 

 Bernard Blier : L'inspecteur Robert Pascal
 Sophie Desmarets : Thérèse Planquine, la fille du chef de la P.J
 Jacques Pills : Marny, alias : Jacques Sartory
 Jean Davy : Alain Dalbrey, le secrétaire de Sartory
 Louis Salou : Mr Tolu, l'original, naturaliste
 Jacques Morel : Raymond Melor, l'imitateur
 Marcel André : Le commissaire Planquine, chef de la P.J
 Jean Wall : Stéphane Marcheau, le pianiste compositeur
 Robert Le Fort : L'inspecteur Legal
 Annette Poivre : Mireille, la secrétaire, dactylo
 Ginette Baudin : Liliane Roy, l'amie de Sartory
 André Wasley : L'inspecteur Bernard
 Jacques Dynam : Le chasseur
 Nathalie Nattier : Louise Chabot, une victime
 Sylvaine Claudel : L'arpète
 Ariane Muratore : Mme Lalorgue
 Odette Barancey : Odette, la domestique des "Planquine"
 Luce Fabiole : Mme Henry
 Emile Riandreys : Deval, le journaliste
 Jacques Hélian et son orchestre
 Belaïeff
 Mercédès Brare
 Denise Benoit
 Léonce Corne

Bibliography 
 Raymond Chirat : Catalogue des films français de long métrage. Films de fiction 1940-1950 (Editions Imprimerie Saint-Paul, S.A., Luxembourg 1981), N°684.

External links 
 
  Affiche sur le site de Unifrance Films

References

1945 films
French black-and-white films
French crime thriller films
Films produced by Raymond Borderie
Films directed by Christian Stengel
1940s French-language films
1945 crime drama films
French crime drama films
Films shot at Joinville Studios
Pathé films
1940s crime thriller films
1940s French films